Potassium nonahydridorhenate(VII) is an inorganic compound having the formula K2ReH9. This colourless salt is soluble in water but only poorly soluble in most alcohols.  The  anion is a rare example of a coordination complex bearing only hydride ligands.

History
The study of rhenium hydrides can be traced to the 1950s and included reports of the "rhenide" anion, supposedly Re−. These reports led to a series of investigations by A. P. Ginsberg and coworkers on the products from the reduction of perrhenate.

The rhenide anion, Re−, was based on the product of the reduction of perrhenate salts, such as the reduction of potassium perrhenate by potassium metal. "Potassium rhenide" was shown to exist as a tetrahydrated complex, with the postulated chemical formula . This compound exhibits strongly reducing properties, and slowly yields hydrogen gas when dissolved in water. The lithium and thallous salts were also reported. Later research, however, indicates that the "rhenide" ion is actually a hydridorhenate complex. "Potassium rhenide" was shown to be in fact the nonahydridorhenate, containing the  anion in which the oxidation state of rhenium is actually +7. Other methods of reduction of perrhenate salts yield compounds containing other hydrido- complexes, including .

Structure, synthesis, and properties

 is an unusual example of a nonacoordinated complex, its high coordination number being attributed to the small size of the hydride ligand and the high positive charge on the Re(VII) center. Its structure consists of a tricapped trigonal prism, as determined by neutron crystallography. The diamagnetic sodium salt, like the analogous technetium compound, is prepared by treating an ethanol solution of sodium perrhenate, NaReO4, with sodium metal. Via cation exchange, it can be converted to the corresponding tetraethylammonium salt, (N(C2H5)4)2ReH9.

Three more hydrogen ligands define a triangle lying parallel to the base and crossing the prism in its center (see figure). Although those hydride ligands are not equivalent, their electronic structure is almost the same. The coordination number of 9 in this complex is the highest known for any rhenium complex.

Recent DFT calculations on  indicate that this dianion adopts the D3h⇌C4v⇌D3h pathway in gas phase and solution, such interconversion originally proposed by Muetterties featuring a capped square antiprism structure as transition state  has very low energy barrier. In  solid, intramolecular motions of  include (1) circle-dance mechanism (resembling Matisse's painting Dance (II)) and (2) three-arm turnstile rotation.

References

Metal hydrides
Potassium compounds
Rhenium compounds